Brunoniella australis, the blue trumpet or blue yam, is a plant native of Australia. A widespread herbaceous plant, found in moist areas of eucalyptus woodland and forest, particularly on sloping ground.

References

Acanthaceae
Flora of New South Wales
Flora of Queensland
Flora of Western Australia
Flora of the Northern Territory
Plants described in 1964
Taxa named by Antonio José Cavanilles